John Charles Wolfe (12 May 1815 – 4January 1871) was an Irish Anglican priest. 

Wolfe was born in Dublin and educated at Trinity College, Dublin. After curacies at Tessauran and Donagh he was the Rector at Ematris from 1850 to 1865. He was Archdeacon of Clogher from 1872 to 1875.

References

1815 births
1871 deaths
Archdeacons of Clogher
Alumni of Trinity College Dublin
Christian clergy from Dublin (city)